Mohsin Ahmad Alaini (20 October 1932 – 25 August 2021) was a Yemeni politician who served as the prime minister of the Yemen Arab Republic five times between 1967 and 1975.

Biography
In 1947, Alaini was selected among other students to do a scholarship in Beirut, then he studied law at the Cairo University in 1952–59, and Sorbonne in 1956–57. In 1957, he published a book, Battles and Conspiracies Against the Yemeni Issue (Arabic: معارك ومؤامرات ضد قضية اليمن). He started his career as a teacher in Aden, where he was involved in the anti-colonial trade union movement from 1960 onwards against British rule. Expelled from Aden by the British in 1961, he returned to Egypt as a delegate of the trade union federation. In Cairo, he joined the Ba'ath Party and allied himself with the moderate Nasserists.

Following the Civil War and the overthrow of the monarchy, he was appointed the first foreign minister of the Yemen Arab Republic.

He subsequently served four terms as Prime Minister under President Abdul Rahman al-Iryani. They were:
 5 November 1967 to 21 December 1967
 29 July 1969 to 2 September 1969
 5 February 1970 to 26 February 1971
 18 September 1971 to 30 December 1972

The fifth and final term was served under Ibrahim al-Hamdi. It was from 22 June 1974 to 16 January 1975.

Between and after these terms he was appointed foreign minister (1962, 1965, 1970–71, 1971–72, 1974), and sent as ambassador to the United Nations (1962–65, 1965–66, 1967–68, 1979–81), the Soviet Union (1968–70), France (1971, 1975–76), the United Kingdom (1973–74), West Germany (1981–84) and United States (1963–66, 1984–97). Back in Yemen he was nominated for the Shura council of elder statesmen.

Alaini died on 25 August 2021, aged 88.

Personal life
In 1962, al-Aini married Aziza Abulahom (Abu Luhum), with whom he had two sons, two daughters and thirteen grandchildren. His brother-in-law and important supporter, Sinan Abu Luhum, was governor of the port city of Al Hudaydah for many years.

References

Literature
Ron Leonard Bidwell: Dictionary of Modern Arab History, page 56f. Routledge, New York 1998
The International Who's Who 1988–89, page 17. Europa Plublications Limited, London 1988
Robert D. Burrowes: Historical Dictionary of Yemen, page 24. Lanham 2010

External links 
rulers.org: Prime Ministers and Foreign Ministers of Yemen (Sana)
ambassadors.net: 50 Years in Shifting Sands (Book Revue)

1932 births
2021 deaths
People from Sanaa Governorate
Cairo University alumni
Prime Ministers of North Yemen
Foreign ministers of Yemen
Ambassadors of Yemen to Germany
Ambassadors of Yemen to France
Ambassadors of Yemen to the Soviet Union
Ambassadors of Yemen to the United States
Permanent Representatives of Yemen to the United Nations
Ambassadors of North Yemen
20th-century prime ministers of Yemen
20th-century Yemeni politicians
Ambassadors of Yemen to the United Kingdom